Michel Étienne Descourtilz (25 November 1775, Boiste near Pithiviers – 1835 or 1836, Paris), was a French physician, botanist and historian of the Haitian Revolution. He was the father of illustrator Jean-Théodore Descourtilz, with whom he sometimes collaborated.

In 1799, after completing his medical studies he traveled to Charleston, South Carolina and Santiago, Cuba, arriving in Haiti on 2 April. Despite a passport from Toussaint Louverture and serving as physician with the forces of Jean-Jacques Dessalines, he was in constant danger. His plant collections were mostly from between Port-au-Prince and Cap-Haïtien and along the Artibonite River. All his natural history collections and many drawings were destroyed during the course of the revolution. In 1803 he returned to France, worked as a physician in a hospital at Beaumont and served as president of the Paris Linnean Society.

As a taxonomist he circumscribed the genus Nauchea (family Fabaceae).

Bibliography
Flore pittoresque et médicale des Antilles, ou, Histoire naturelle des plantes usuelles des colonies françaises, anglaises, espagnoles et portugaises; par M.E. Descourtilz. Peinte par J. Th. Descourtilz. Vols. 1-8 
Voyages d'un naturaliste, et ses observations faites sur les trois règnes de la nature, dans plusieurs ports de mer français, en Espagne, au continent de l'Amérique Septentrionale, à Saint Yago de Cub. Vols.1-3
  Complete bibliography on WorldCat.
Descourtilz, Michel Étienne, 2021. Flore médicale des Antilles. New edition established by César Delnatte, ethnobotanist. (Collection de la Fondation Clément). Bordeaux, Hervé Chopin. 245 p. 100 tables reproduced.

Sources and references 
  Biography in French with bibliography from the Dictionnaire encyclopédique des sciences médicales.
 Urban, Ignaz. Notae biographicae, Symb. Antill. 3:36,1900.

External links
 Plants named by Descourtilz on IPNI
 

1775 births
1836 deaths
19th-century French botanists
French mycologists
Botanists with author abbreviations
Botanists active in North America
Botanists active in the Caribbean
19th-century French historians
19th-century French physicians
French male non-fiction writers
People of Saint-Domingue